Radnovac is a village in Požega-Slavonia County, Croatia. The village is administered as a part of the Jakšić municipality.
According to national census of 2001, population of the village is 220. The village is connected by the D51 state road.

Note: First record of village named Radnovac in 1931.

Sources

Populated places in Požega-Slavonia County